Hong-Yee Chiu (born October 1932) is a Taiwanise-American astrophysicist, at NASA for 35 years, and successful publisher of EHGBooks micro-publishing company.  He was born in Shanghai, China.

Career
Chiu graduated from National Taiwan University and in 1959 received his PhD in Astrophysics from Cornell University. After graduation, he was a member at the Institute for Advanced Study in Princeton, New Jersey, until 1961.

Chiu served as a Space Astrophysics Scientist for NASA for over 35 years.  He was credited as the first scientist to introduce the term "quasar," in his Physics Today article in May 1964.  In 1969, Chiu became the first Chinese-American scientist to receive the NASA Exceptional Scientific Achievement Medal.

After his retirement from NASA, Chiu started the EHanism Group and developed an EHGBooks micropublishing app with some notable Chinese computer scientists in order to promote Chinese culture and Sinology memory. With his niece and assistant Nonny Hsueh, the family helped the National Central Library of Taiwan to participate in the World Digital Library organization under the auspices of UNESCO in 2008. Later on, Chiu led the EHanism Group to develop the first Amazon Micropublishing Chinese Solution in 2012. Chiu is the host of the 2013 Taiwan Reunion Program for NTU Early Graduates in commemoration of the 85th anniversary of National Taiwan University.

Family
His father, Han-Ping Chiu, was a famous economist and lawyer in Shanghai during the Republican Era in China and the financial prime minister of Fukien Province, China. His late brother Hungdah Chiu was a notable scholar of international law.

Research
 "Gravitational collapse" Physics Today 17, 5, 21 (1964)
 "A Tunable X-ray Interferometer and the Empirical Determination of Phase Diffracted X-rays"
 "Supernovae, Neutrinos, and Neutron Stars"
 "Neutrino Theory of Stellar Collapse in Type II Supernovae"

Publications
2012: Literature and Science / EHGBooks, USA
2012: Bilingual Introduction to Chinese and Western Poetry / EHGBooks, USA
2011: The Real China: Meteoric Renaissance – Relations with the West / EHGBooks, USA
2011: War among Gods and Men / EHGBooks, USA

References

External links
 Hong-Yee Chiu's "Memoirs Micro-publishing Project" (Chinese)  NTU Campus Journal Report, November 21, 2012.
 "Chiu: China Needs East and West"  World Journal News Report, November 12, 2012.
 "Chiu: Lecture Report"  World Journal News Report, November 18, 2012.
 "Chiu: Lecture Report"  World Journal News Report, November 8, 2012.
 CTITV interview  CTITV, November 8, 2012.
 Chiu interview, "Human Rights Award for Dr. Li-Zhi Fang"  Yuan-Jian Magazine, January 1990.
 NTU Early Graduate official website
 Taiwan Fellowship Publishing App
 


Taiwanese emigrants to the United States
1932 births
NASA astrophysicists
Living people
Institute for Advanced Study people
Cornell University alumni
National Taiwan University alumni